Juan Manuel Salgueiro Silva (born April 3, 1983) is a Uruguayan football striker who plays for Club Sportivo San Lorenzo.

Career
Salgueiro started his professional career with Danubio in Montevideo. He was part of the squad that won the Uruguayan Primera División in 2004. Salgueiro had a loan spell with Real Murcia in Spain in 2006 and in 2007, followed by a brief spell at Mexican Club Necaxa before joining Estudiantes later that year. After finishing as the runner-up in 2008 Copa Sudamericana, Salgueiro was part of the Estudiantes squad that won 2009 Copa Libertadores. Salguerio subsequently transferred to LDU Quito in January 2010 as the team's reinforcement. in 2012 Olimpia

Honors
Danubio
Primera División: 2004
Estudiantes de La Plata
Copa Libertadores: 2009
LDU Quito 
Serie A: 2010
Recopa Sudamericana: 2010

See also
 List of expatriate footballers in Paraguay
 Players and Records in Paraguayan Football

Notes

References

External links
 
 Argentine Primera statistics 
 
 Football-Lineups player profile
 

1983 births
Living people
Footballers from Montevideo
Uruguayan footballers
Uruguayan expatriate footballers
Association football forwards
Danubio F.C. players
Real Murcia players
Club Necaxa footballers
Estudiantes de La Plata footballers
L.D.U. Quito footballers
San Lorenzo de Almagro footballers
Club Olimpia footballers
Deportivo Toluca F.C. players
Botafogo de Futebol e Regatas players
Club Nacional footballers
Club Libertad footballers
Club Sportivo San Lorenzo footballers
Uruguayan Primera División players
Argentine Primera División players
Paraguayan Primera División players
Ecuadorian Serie A players
Segunda División players
Liga MX players
Campeonato Brasileiro Série A players
Copa Libertadores-winning players
Uruguayan expatriate sportspeople in Argentina
Uruguayan expatriate sportspeople in Paraguay
Uruguayan expatriate sportspeople in Ecuador
Uruguayan expatriate sportspeople in Mexico
Uruguayan expatriate sportspeople in Spain
Uruguayan expatriate sportspeople in Brazil
Expatriate footballers in Argentina
Expatriate footballers in Paraguay
Expatriate footballers in Ecuador
Expatriate footballers in Mexico
Expatriate footballers in Spain
Expatriate footballers in Brazil